Dorcadion ferruginipes is a species of beetle in the family Cerambycidae. It was described by Édouard Ménétries in 1836. It is known from Turkey.

References

ferruginipes
Beetles described in 1836